Bortezomib/dexamethasone is a combination drug against multiple myeloma. When bortezomib is used by the trade name Velcade, the combination is called Vel/Dex (or Vel-Dex or Veldex). Bortezomib is a proteasome inhibitor and dexamethasone is a corticosteroid.

References 

Combination drugs